Jeremy Bobb (born May 13, 1981) is an American actor who has appeared on stage, television and in feature films. He had a recurring role in CBS's 2013 drama Hostages as White House Chief of Staff Quintin Creasy and co-starred as Herman Barrow in the Cinemax TV series The Knick. In 2014, he played Stevie in the crime-drama film The Drop. In 2019, Bobb appeared in the Netflix series Russian Doll.

He attended Otterbein University and received a Bachelor of Fine Arts degree in 2003.

Filmography

Film

Television

References

External links
 

American male film actors
American male television actors
American male voice actors
Otterbein University alumni
Living people
1981 births
People from Dublin, Ohio
Male actors from Ohio